Thomas J. Jenkins (6 June 1902 – 6 August 1979) was an Australian rules footballer who played with Essendon and North Melbourne in the Victorian Football League (VFL) during the 1920s. 

Jenkins arrived at Essendon in 1921 after his VFA club North Melbourne had disbanded and spent five seasons with the Bombers. Short but large, Jenkins played mostly as a full-forward and was a premiership player in 1923 and 1924. He twice topped Essendon's goalkicking, in 1924 with 50 goals and 1925 with 37 goals. His best tally in a game was nine goals against North Melbourne in 1925, who had by then reformed and joined the VFL. In 1927, he returned to his old club but could manage only three senior games.

In later life he ran a stall at the Queen Victoria Market.

References

External links
Essendon past player profile

Australian Football profile

1902 births
1979 deaths
Australian rules footballers from Victoria (Australia)
Australian Rules footballers: place kick exponents
Essendon Football Club players
Essendon Football Club Premiership players
North Melbourne Football Club players
North Melbourne Football Club (VFA) players
Two-time VFL/AFL Premiership players